Elmwood Cemetery (also known as Elm Leaf Cemetery) is a  cemetery established in 1900 (as Elm Leaf Cemetery) in Birmingham, Alabama northwest of Homewood by a group of fraternal organizations. It was renamed in 1906 and gradually eclipsed Oak Hill Cemetery as the most prominent burial place in the city. In 1900 it consisted of 40 acres, adding 40 more acres in 1904, 80 more acres in 1909, 80 more acres in 1910, 43 acres in 1924, and reached 286 acres in 1928.

Background
In the late 1930s, Mexican sculptor Dionicio Rodriguez created a number of large concrete sculptures for the cemetery, including a palm tree, a bridge, and a fallen log 'carved' into a bench.

The cemetery was whites only until 1970 when the family of a black soldier who died in Vietnam won a lawsuit in federal court to force the cemetery to allow their son to be buried there.

It has a chapel funeral home at 800 Dennison Avenue Southwest which was established in 1962 by the Lackey family for Johns-Ridout's Mortuary. The cemetery is part of the Dignity Memorial chain.

The cemetery is roughly bounded by Martin Luther King, Jr. Drive, Dennison Avenue Southwest, 14th Place Southwest, and railroad tracks. The main entrance is directly across from 6th Avenue Southwest. There is a secondary entrance on Martin Luther King Drive just behind the Johns-Ridout's Mortuary.

The cemetery is made up of about fifty large blocks, of varying shapes and sizes, each of which contains up to several hundred lots; each lot contains as many as eight or ten burial plots. As of early 2017, the cemetery contained about 130,000 burials. Notable sections include at least two areas dedicated to newborns and infants, with brass plaques that say "BABYLAND" on them. There are also four mausoleums.

The body of 16th Street Baptist Church bombing victim, Denise McNair was exhumed from Shadow Lawn Memorial Park to this cemetery by her parents in August 2007.

Notable burials 
 Truman H. Aldrich (1848–1932) – U. S. Representative 1896–1897
 William W. Allen (1835–1894) – Confederate Major General
 Mary Anderson (1866–1953) – inventor of the windshield wiper
 Donald Beatty (1900–1980) – aviator, explorer and inventor
 Sydney J. Bowie (1865–1928) – U. S. Representative 1901–1907
 Paul W. "Bear" Bryant (1913–1983) – University of Alabama football coach
 Anna Lee "Boots" Carroll (1930–2017) – American theater, film & television actress
 Ben Chapman (1908–1993) – Major League baseball player and manager
 B. B. Comer (1848–1927) – Governor of Alabama 1907–1911, U. S. Senator 1920
 Father James Coyle (1873–1921) – assassinated priest of St. Paul's church
 George Gordon Crawford (1869–1936) – Industrialist and second graduate of Georgia Tech
 Russell McWhortor Cunningham (1855–1921) – Governor of Alabama 1904–1905
 Spud Davis (1904–1984) – professional baseball player and manager
 Henry T. DeBardeleben (1874–1948) – Coal magnate
 William Henry Denson (1846–1906) – U. S. Representative 1893–1895
 Eddie Dent (1887–1974) – professional baseball player
 Joe Domnanovich (1919–2009) – professional football player
 Henry Eugene "Red" Erwin, Sr. (1921–2002) – World War II veteran – Medal of Honor recipient
 William Dudley Geer (1922–2003) – first Dean of the School of Business at Samford University
 Milton L. Grafman (1907–1995) – Former Rabbi of Temple Emanuel and civil rights figure
 John Grenier (1930–2007) – Alabama Republican Party chairman
 Sam Hairston (1920–1997) – Major League baseball player
 Art Hanes (1916–1997) – Mayor of Birmingham 1961–1963
 Lum Harris (1915–1996) – professional baseball manager (Houston Astros & Atlanta Braves)
 Erskine Hawkins (1914–1993) – Musician, trumpeter, composer
 Cliff Holman (1929–2008) – Birmingham television celebrity
 George Huddleston (1869–1960) – U. S. Representative 1915–1937
 George Huddleston, Jr. (1920–1971) – U. S. Representative 1955–1965
 Patti Ruffner Jacobs (1875–1935) – social reformer
 Joseph Forney Johnston (1843–1913) – Governor of Alabama 1896–1900, U. S. Senator 1907–1913
 Eddie Kendricks (1939–1992) – singer, co-founder of The Temptations
 Larry Langford (1946–2019) – Alabama politician
 Dee Miles (1909–1976) – Major League baseball player
 John P. Newsome (1893–1961) – U. S. Representative 1943–1945
 Louise O. Charlton (1889–1967) – Federal Commissioner and judge, 1924–1965
 Luther Patrick (1894–1957) – U. S. Representative 1937–1943
 John C. Persons (1888-1974) - lawyer and U.S. Major General
 Sun Ra (1914–1993) – Jazz musician
 Erskine Ramsay (1864–1953) – Inventor, engineer, philanthropist
 Rufus N. Rhodes (1856–1910) – founder of the Birmingham News
 Bo Russell (1916–1997) – professional football player
 Ed Salem (1928–2001) – professional football player and restaurateur
 Albert Lee Smith, Jr. (1931–1997) – U.S. representative from Alabama's 6th congressional district from 1981 to 1983
 Fred Sington (1910–1998) – professional football player
 Jesse F. Stallings (1856–1928) – U. S. Representative 1893–1901
 Pat Sullivan (1950–2019) – Football player and coach.
 Oscar Underwood (1862–1929) – U. S. Senator 1915–1927
 Dixie Walker (1887–1965), Fred "Dixie" Walker's father 
 Dixie Walker (1911–1982) – Major League baseball player
 Frank S. White (1847–1922) – U. S. Senator 1914–1915
 Abraham Woods (1928–2008) – minister and civil rights activist
 Yam Yaryan (1892–1964) – Major League baseball player

References

External links 
 
 

Cemeteries in Birmingham, Alabama
1900 establishments in Alabama
Cemeteries established in the 1900s